Rose Lake may refer to:

 Rose Lake Township, Michigan
 Rose Lake (Martin County, Minnesota)
 Rose Lake (Pigeon River), in Cook County, Minnesota
 Rose Lake in Mahoning County and Hocking Hills Reservoir in Hocking County, Ohio
 Rose Lake, British Columbia, an unincorporated community
 Rose Lake (British Columbia) (disambiguation), several lakes in Canada
 The Rose Lake, an orchestral work by British composer Sir Michael Tippett

See also
 Lake Rose (disambiguation)